Jeremain Marciano Lens (born 24 November 1987) is a Dutch professional footballer who plays for  club Versailles. He is a versatile attacking player, known for his pace and stamina, primarily being used as a winger or a striker, but he can successfully play as a second striker.

Lens began his career at AZ, and after a loan at NEC, played a part in their 2008–09 Eredivisie triumph. In 2010, he moved to PSV, where he won the 2011–12 KNVB Cup, and in 2013 was signed by Dynamo Kyiv. He won the Ukrainian Cup in his first season, the double in his second, and signed for Sunderland in July 2015.

Lens is a full international for the Netherlands, and has earned 34 caps. In August 2010, he received his first international cap against Ukraine and scored a debut goal. He was part of the Dutch squad which came third at the 2014 FIFA World Cup.

Club career

AZ 
Lens made his debut into professional football in the 2005–06 season. He played two matches for AZ that season. Before that, he played in the youth team of AZ, Omniworld, Ajax and his regional team, Spartaan.

In June 2007, AZ reached a deal concerning a loan involving Lens; it meant he would play the 2007–08 season for NEC, and that he would return to AZ the season afterwards. Lens agreed with the deal, and the player officially joined NEC on loan in the summer of 2007.

NEC (loan) 
After a difficult beginning with his new club NEC before the winter, Lens' as well as his team's situation improved with Lens scoring eight goals in 16 matches. NEC qualified for the UEFA Cup preliminaries. For a long time, it seemed he would join NEC permanently, but he eventually decided to return to AZ.

Return to AZ 
In July 2008, Lens had an operation on his left foot, which meant he was out for some time. The 2008–09 season was a personal disappointment for Lens, who did not contribute much to AZ's championship win. When head coach Louis van Gaal left the team for Bayern Munich, Lens saw a chance for himself to play more matches. He grabbed the chance under the new coach, and he played well and scored important goals for AZ.

PSV 

On 21 May 2010, PSV contracted Lens for four years, swapping Dirk Marcellis as part of the deal. Lens was given the number 9 shirt, and his first year at the club was a successful one for the player. He was moved from a central position to the flanks, being more utilised on both wings or working behind strikers as a second striker. He struggled to score in first few matches, but eventually became used to the new position. He reached the Europa League quarter-finals with the team, scoring 3 goals in 11 appearances, and reached 10 Eredivisie goals in 33 appearances, while the Eindhoven-based team only finished in third place, despite being the table leaders for the most of the 2010–11 season.

At the beginning of the 2011–12 season, Lens' jersey number was changed to number 11, which was free since the departure of Nordin Amrabat to Kayserispor in January 2011. On 6 November 2011, Lens came in from the bench against Heracles and scored a hat-trick, his first for the club.

Dynamo Kyiv 

On 18 June 2013, Lens signed a four-year contract with Ukrainian club Dynamo Kyiv. On 29 August, he scored his first official goal for Dynamo, opening the score on the ninth minute of a 5–1 victory over Kazakhstani club Aktobe in the UEFA Europa League play-offs second leg, an 8–3 aggregate win. On 6 October, Lens scored his first two goals in the Ukrainian Premier League in a crushing 9–1 victory over Metalurh Donetsk. He helped Dynamo win the Ukrainian Cup in his first season.

On 23 April 2015, Lens was sent off for two bookings in the first half, as Dynamo lost 0–2 at Fiorentina and were eliminated from the quarter-finals of the Europa League. His second yellow card was when the referee judged that he had dived in the penalty area. In his second and final season for Dynamo, he managed to help his team win both the Premier League and Ukrainian Cup without suffering a single defeat in both competitions.

Sunderland 
On 15 July 2015, after completing a medical, Sunderland signed Lens for an undisclosed fee on a four-year contract. This move reunited him with head coach Dick Advocaat after previously working under him at PSV and AZ.

Lens scored his first English Premier League goal on 29 August 2015, securing a 2–2 draw at Aston Villa. He scored his second Sunderland goal against West Ham United on 3 October 2015, lobbing the ball over goalkeeper Adrián to put Sunderland 2–0 ahead. However, Lens was then sent off after receiving two yellow cards for rash tackles, and West Ham went on to earn a 2–2 draw. The match turned out to be Advocaat's final one in charge of Sunderland, as he left the club the next day.

Lens stated he was unhappy at Sunderland, suggesting he could leave the club in the January transfer window as he "did not come to the Premier League to sit on the bench". Lens started in Sunderland's FA Cup third round tie against Arsenal, and scored the opening goal in the match, after which Arsenal came back to win 3–1.

Fenerbahçe (loan) 
On 30 August 2016, Lens was loaned to Fenerbahçe on a season-long deal.

Beşiktaş 
On 6 August 2017, Beşiktaş signed Lens on loan, with the option of a permanent transfer afterwards. He scored his debut goal for the club in a 2–2 draw against Trabzonspor. Playing as a replacement for Ricardo Quaresma, he managed to find the net in the 58th minute of the match. On 7 June 2018, it was confirmed that Lens had signed four years contract for Beşiktaş.

Versailles 
After not playing for any club in the 2021–22 season despite remaining under contract with Beşiktaş, on 28 July 2022 Lens signed with French third-tier Championnat National club Versailles. He made his debut for the club on 26 August 2022, replacing Jordan Leborgne in the 69th minute of a 2–0 home win over Bourg-en-Bresse Péronnas. Lens scored his first goal for Versailles on 25 November, coming off the bench for Mondy Prunier and scoring in injury time to secure a 2–0 victory against Villefranche Beaujolais.

International career

Suriname 
Although Lens previously played for the Netherlands under-21 team, he chose to play for the Suriname national team, since his roots (parents) are Surinamese. In 2009, Lens was called up for Suriname's squad by national team coach Wensley Bundel, for the Parbo Bier Cup. He scored two goals in three matches and helped Suriname finish second in the tournament.
	
Since the tournament was not under the auspices of FIFA, Lens was still eligible for a call-up for the Netherlands.

Netherlands 
On 3 May 2010, Lens was called up for the Dutch national team, as a part of the preparations for the 2010 FIFA World Cup. However, on 27 May 2010, Netherlands manager Bert van Marwijk announced that the player would not be part of the final 23-man squad participating in the competition. On 11 August 2010, Lens made his debut in a 1–1 friendly draw with Ukraine, scoring the only goal for the Oranje.

Lens became a regular member of the Dutch team under the management of his former AZ coach Louis van Gaal. He scored five goals and made a further five assists during the 2014 World Cup qualification campaign.

Lens was named in the Netherlands squad for the 2014 World Cup in Brazil. He appeared as a substitute in the Netherlands' first two Group B games (a 1–5 win over Spain and a 2–3 victory against Australia) before starting in a 2–0 victory over Chile. Lens played the full 120 minutes of the semi-final against Argentina, which Argentina ultimately won on penalties.

Career statistics

Club

International

Honours 
AZ
 Eredivisie: 2008–09
 Johan Cruyff Shield: 2009

PSV
 KNVB Cup: 2011–12
 Johan Cruyff Shield: 2012

Dynamo Kyiv
 Ukrainian Premier League: 2014–15
 Ukrainian Cup: 2013–14, 2014–15
Netherlands
FIFA World Cup Third place: 2014

References

External links 

Holland U19 stats at OnsOranje 
Holland U20 stats at OnsOranje 
Holland U21 stats at OnsOranje 
 

1987 births
Living people
Dutch footballers
Dutch sportspeople of Surinamese descent
AZ Alkmaar players
NEC Nijmegen players
PSV Eindhoven players
Sunderland A.F.C. players
FC Dynamo Kyiv players
Fenerbahçe S.K. footballers
Beşiktaş J.K. footballers
Fatih Karagümrük S.K. footballers
FC Versailles 78 players
Footballers from Amsterdam
Association football wingers
Association football forwards
Premier League players
Eredivisie players
Ukrainian Premier League players
Süper Lig players
Championnat National players
Netherlands youth international footballers
Netherlands under-21 international footballers
Netherlands international footballers
2014 FIFA World Cup players
Dutch expatriate footballers
Expatriate footballers in Ukraine
Expatriate footballers in England
Expatriate footballers in Turkey
Expatriate footballers in France
Dutch expatriate sportspeople in Ukraine
Dutch expatriate sportspeople in England
Dutch expatriate sportspeople in Turkey
Dutch expatriate sportspeople in France